Victor Luis Juan Hilado Neri   (born February 19, 1976) is a Filipino actor, singer and chef.

Personal life 
Neri is also a chef and owns a restaurant named Saute. In 2007, Neri took a break from the entertainment industry and spent three years in Bangkok, studying Culinary Arts in Le Cordon Bleu and moonlighting as a cook in a Thai restaurant. He also spent two and a half years in Hong Kong to work for an insurance company and more than a year in Beijing to study Mandarin.

Neri also trained as a bomb disposal technician in the Philippine Coastguard and briefly worked in the Philippines' Bureau of Immigrations' fugitive search unit.

Neri was a Catholic before joining Iglesia ni Cristo.

Victor also worked in the DSWD as a Driver then to Assistant Secretary during President Duterte's term.

Actor and Ang Tv co-star Christopher Roxas is his close friend.

Filmography

Television

Film

Discography

Studio albums

Guest appearances

References

External links
 

Living people
1976 births
Filipino male television actors
ABS-CBN personalities
Star Magic
GMA Network personalities
21st-century Filipino male actors